Saint Pompeia (in Latin: Alma Pompeia or in Breton: Koupaia ), also known as Aspasia, is a legendary Breton saint who supposedly lived in the 6th century. Her feast day is celebrated on 2 January.

Legendary biography 
According to the life of her son, Tudwal, Pompeia was the sister of King Riwal II of Domnonée. Tradition at Langoat further asserts that she became one of the wives of the fictional King Hoel Mawr (or the Great) who was invented by Geoffrey of Monmouth as a supposed overlord of all Brittany. After being exiled in Britain for some years, Pompeia eventually returned to her husband's kingdom with her daughter, Saint Scaeva, and her son, Saint Tudwal. She settled near the monastery of Tréguier, founded by the latter, and died where the church of Langoat stands today. Her relics are still preserved there and a shrine has been erected to her memory.

Family
Saint Pompeia was the mother of:
 Saint Tudwal: one of the seven founding saints of Brittany
 Sainte Scaeva
 Saint Lenorius

Breton legacy
 Langoat: Saint Pompeia's Church in the shape of a Latin cross stands there. Inside is the shrine said to be of Saint Pompeia and bas-relief panels recounting her legend.
 Sainte-Sève: Saint Scaeva's Church there contains a statue of Saint Pompeia; the name of the locality, Trébompé, probably stems from a corruption of the name Pompeia.
 Valley of the Saints: A statue of Saint Pompeia sculpted by P. Le Guen and P. Leost in blue granite from Lanhelin, was erected in 2012.
 Trézény: There is a stained glass window representing Saint Pompeia in the Saint Zény's Church.

References 

Medieval Breton saints
6th-century rulers of Brittany
545 deaths